"Misty Circles" is a song written and recorded by English pop band Dead or Alive. It was co-produced by the band and Zeus B. Held and released as the first single from Dead or Alive's debut studio album Sophisticated Boom Boom (1984).

Background
"Misty Circles" was the first song to be released by Dead or Alive after being signed to a major label, Epic Records. The band's prior single releases were issued independently. This song was not very successful, but it managed to peak at No. 100 on the UK Singles Chart. In 1984, the song was placed on the B-side of "You Spin Me Round (Like a Record)". As both sides earned significant play in American nightclubs, they charted together as a double-sided hit on the U.S. Hot Dance Club Play chart, peaking at No. 4. The band performed it before a live audience on Razzmatazz, which featured Burns in dreadlocks, wearing a Vivienne Westwood outfit and large hat similar to Boy George's then appearance, creating friction between the two performers for short period of time.

Track listing

Chart performance
The single became the band's first entry on the UK Singles Chart in June 1983, as well as their lowest charting single, peaking at No. 100. Also gaining play in U.S. clubs, it reached No. 4 on the Hot Dance Club Play chart in 1983.

External links

1983 singles
Dead or Alive (band) songs
Songs written by Pete Burns
1983 songs
Songs written by Mike Percy (musician)
Epic Records singles
Songs written by Wayne Hussey